Joinville Esporte Clube, JEC  or simply Joinville, is a Brazilian football team from Joinville in Santa Catarina . Founded on January 29, 1976 they have won the
Série B and Série C once and they have the largest sequence of consecutive state titles, eight (1978, 1979, 1980, 1981, 1982, 1983, 1984, 1985).

Joinville is the third most successful club in Santa Catarina in terms of state championship titles (12), behind Avaí (16) and Figueirense (17).

History
Joinville was founded on January 29, 1976, after América-SC football department and Caxias football department fused. The club's Golden Age was in the 1980s, when the club won eight state championships in a row.

Joinville's largest win was on October 31, 1976, when the club beat Ipiranga of Tangará 11–1 at Estádio Municipal de Tangará.

The club won the Copa Santa Catarina in 2009, and then the Recopa Sul-Brasileira in the same year, after beating Serrano Centro-Sul 3–2 in the final. They won the Copa Santa Catarina again in 2011. Joinville also won the Série C in 2011, after beating CRB 3–1 and 4–0 in the final. The club won the Copa Santa Catarina for the third time in 2012. In 2014, the club won the Campeonato Brasileiro Série B, returning to the Série A after 29 years of absence.

Joinville were relegated to the Serie B in 2015 after coming in last place in the Serie A, and then relegated once again to Serie C in 2016.

Honours
Série B: 1
2014

Série C: 1
2011

Campeonato Catarinense: 12
1976, 1978, 1979, 1980, 1981, 1982, 1983, 1984, 1985, 1987, 2000, 2001

Copa Santa Catarina: 5
2009, 2011, 2012, 2013, 2020

Recopa Sul-Brasileira: 1
2009

Recopa Catarinense: 1
2021

Campeonato Catarinense Série B: 3
2005, 2006, 2007

Stadium

Rivals
Joinville's greatest rivals are Avaí, Figueirense and Criciúma.

The matches between Criciúma and Joinville Esporte Clube are called Interior Classic, by the media and fans of these clubs and others.

Mascot and nickname
The club's mascot is a rabbit. Joinville is nicknamed JEC, which is an acronym of the club's full name.

Current squad

Out on loan

National competitions record

Seasons

Managers
 João Francisco (1985)
 Hélio dos Anjos (1985–89)
 Edu Coimbra (1987)
 Arturzinho (2011)
 Leandro Campos (2012)
 Marcelo Serrano (2012)
 Artur Neto (2012–13)
 Arturzinho (2013)
 Ricardo Drubscky (2013)
 Sérgio Ramirez (2013)
 Hemerson Maria (2014–15)
 Adílson Batista (2015)
 PC Gusmão (2015–16)
 Hemerson Maria (2016)
 Lisca (2016)
 Ramon Menezes (2016)
 Fabinho Santos (2017)
 Pingo (2017)
 Rogério Zimmermann (2017-)

Futsal

Joinville has a futsal team in partnership with the company Krona Tubos e Conexões that plays top tier futsal in the Liga Nacional de Futsal.

References

External links
 Official website
 Unofficial website
 União Tricolor Official website

 
Association football clubs established in 1976
Football clubs in Santa Catarina (state)
1976 establishments in Brazil